Melanie Hogan (born 8 July, 1977) is a film director and producer, known for her works in Australian documentary cinema. Hogan became first known with her directorial debut Kanyini which premiered at the Sydney Film Festival in 2006. The film came out of Hogan’s personal realization that she had not learnt anything about the history of her country, Australia, from an Aboriginal perspective despite studying in Australian Institutions right through to tertiary level. She also lamented the fact that she did not know anything about the world's oldest living culture.

Overview
Since 2004 Melanie has made groundbreaking documentaries in remote Aboriginal communities exposing often challenging stories at the highest level.
 
Her first documentary Kanyini (2006) was distributed in cinemas in Australia by Hopscotch Films. It won the 2006 Discovery Channel Inside Film Best Documentary Award, the Independent Spirit Inside Film Award and the Best Documentary Award at the London Australian Film Festival (2007).
 
Melanie's other documentary films Yajilarra (2008) and Tristan (2011) both premiered at the United Nations in New York and at Government House with Australia's Governor General, Quentin Bryce as host. Yajilarra received a standing ovation at the UN and stimulated much discussion.
 
In 2009-2012 Melanie directed, produced, wrote and edited an online project for the Australian Federal Government called the Stolen Generations Testimonies. The site's purpose is to assist the nation in healing from one of its most horrendous chapters. Further testimonies will be recorded in 2014/15.
 
Melanie is currently working on another documentary set in the remote communities of the Kimberley and writing her first feature film.

Films and documentaries

Kanyini
Kanyini is her attempt to connect fellow Australians with the story of Australia’s past and present from an Anangu perspective in the hope Australia can move forward in proper friendship with Australia’s Indigenous peoples. The film’s title is ‘Kanyini: 40,000 years of culture, one philosophy that connects us all.’

Kanyini tells the story of one Aboriginal man from Pitjantjatjara country called Bob Randall and the separation he experienced from his country, his family, his traditional lore and his spirituality since he was a young child, as a result of Europeans imposing their superior sense of self and their will on the Indigenous people of Australia. It is therefore also a story of Indigenous wisdom clashing against materialist notions of progress. Despite the fact his people are struggling in a modern world, Bob hopes non-Indigenous and Indigenous Australians can walk together going forward, even though they have not done so in the past. As Bob explains, "The Earth is our Mother. That makes you and me brother and sister."

Kanyini is a story that is fundamental for understanding contemporary Australia, for only by knowing our past and our present can we dream of a future that includes everyone. Kanyini won the Independent Spirit Award as well as the National Geographic Best Documentary Award at the Australian Inside Film Awards the year the film was released.

After Kanyini was released, Hogan went on to develop an education program called Yarnup around Australia, which attempted to connect Australian high school students with their local Indigenous elders.

Yajilarra
Still committed to connecting with Indigenous Australians, Hogan then directed her next documentary in the Kimberley in 2008 with the inspirational and courageous women of Fitzroy Crossing. The film’s title was devised by the local women themselves: ‘Yajilarra’ which means ‘to dream’ in the Bunuba language.

The project came about because the federal sex discrimination officer at the time, Elizabeth Broderick, had heard about what the local women had done to reduce the devastating effects of excessive alcohol consumption in their Fitzroy Valley communities and she wanted their heroic story to be told to the world. She contacted Hogan to direct the film.

Essentially the women of the community came together, led by June Oscar AO and Emily Carter, and led a campaign to place a ban on the sale of full strength alcohol in their community. The ban, which was not without controversy, resulted in a 43% reduction in domestic violence reports, a 55% reduction in alcohol related hospital presentations, an increase in school attendance levels and an 88% reduction in the amount of alcohol purchased. The film premiered at the United Nations Commission on the Status of Women in New York in 2009 where it received a standing ovation.

Tristan
In 2011 the women asked Hogan to return to the community to make another film about the children who had fetal alcohol spectrum disorders (FASD) as a result of women drinking excessively during pregnancy. The film was made to educate the wider community about the dangers of drinking during pregnancy as well as to educate the world about the support such children need in order to live fulfilling lives given their disability. The film’s title ‘Tristan’ brings to life the struggles of a 12-year-old boy living with FASD. It also highlights the efforts by the members of the Fitzroy Valley community to deal with the disease. The film premiered at the United Nations Headquarters in New York in 2012.

Stolen Generations Testimonies
Hogan launched another project in 2011: an Online Museum devoted to capturing the testimonies of Australia's Stolen Generations. The museum was launched at Parliament House to commemorate the 4th anniversary of the Apology to the Stolen Generations. Hogan had been capturing testimonies since 2009 inspired by Steven Spielberg's Shoah Foundation. By 2012, 46 testimonies had been collected from around Australia.

By allowing Australians to listen to the Survivors’ stories with open hearts and without judgement, it is hoped, more people will be engaged in the healing process. The project has been created with the aim of producing a national treasure and a sacred keeping place for Stolen Generations’ Survivors testimonies.

“For those people who do feel challenged by the Stolen Generations’ we ask you to listen to just one of the testimonies to see if you still feel the same. That’s all we ask.” Debra Hocking, Survivor.

Indigenous children were taken from their families from the very early days of the colony. On the frontier there were many instances of children who were kidnapped by settlers who often became servants for the newcomers. On missions and reserves across the country children were often separated from their families. They slept in dormitories and had very limited contact with their parents. This system helped convert the children to Christianity by removing them from the cultural influence of their people. But the removal of Aboriginal children intensified at the end of the 19th century. There were a number of Aboriginal children being born of mixed race. Colonial authorities believed the children with training and education could be absorbed into the white population ridding them of the so-called ‘half caste’ problem.

Professor Anna Haebich – Historian.  “Imagine this scenario of police patrolling and observing things and noting down who was where and looking out for half caste children and then they might do an early morning raid so there everybody is sleeping, they might be just starting to wake up and police come thundering in on their horses. Aboriginal families had developed over time little ways of trying to stop the children from being taken away. They had look-outs and warning systems and kids might rush off into the bush. Some families put them in suitcases, sat on the suitcase,  they might have, if they knew about it might have the children blackened up with charcoal.”

Aboriginal children across the country were taken from their families and placed in institutions and foster homes, often not knowing their parents were alive or searching for them. They were taught to reject their Aboriginality, and often experienced abuse and deprivation.

In 1997 the Commonwealth Government undertook an inquiry into the Stolen Generations as these children had come to be known. Hundreds of Survivors gave evidence of their experiences and a report of the extent of these practices was made public.

Professor Marcia Langton- Anthropologist – “If we were to compare the impact of these so called assimilation policies in their consequences to doing something similar to the Australian population today. Let’s say we’d leave one third of Australians living in their family homes, living their lifestyles. Another third we’d take out of their homes and we’d put them in the illegal immigrant detention centres and then the other third, take them away from their families, their children and we’d enslave them and we’d make them work on cattle stations and on mines or leave them with strange families to cook and clean.” 
Many of the Stolen Generations are still finding their way home, still searching for the families they lost and putting together the pieces of their lives.

Awards

References

External links
 
 Melanie Hogan Youtube
 Stolen Generations Testimonies
 SBS The Movie Show interview with Bob Randall and Melanie Hogan
 The Sydney Morning Herald article; Lights, Camera, Reconciliation
 Stolen Generations' stories go digital, SBS online
 Stolen Generations' stories collected, SBS World News Australia
 Stolen Generations Testimonies

Australian film producers
Living people
1977 births